Barvinkove Raion was a raion (district) in Kharkiv Oblast of Ukraine. Its administrative center was the city of Barvinkove. The raion was abolished on 18 July 2020 as part of the administrative reform of Ukraine, which reduced the number of raions of Kharkiv Oblast to seven. The area of Barvinkove Raion was merged into Izium Raion. The last estimate of the raion population was 

At the time of disestablishment, the raion consisted of one hromada, Barvinkove urban hromada with the administration in Barvinkove.

References 

Former raions of Kharkiv Oblast
1923 establishments in Ukraine
Ukrainian raions abolished during the 2020 administrative reform